The Humphreys or Humfreys Baronetcy, of London, was a title in the Baronetage of Great Britain. It was created on 30 November 1714 for William Humphreys, Lord Mayor of London and later Member of Parliament for Marlborough. The title became extinct on the death of his only son, the second baronet, in 1737.

Humphreys baronets, of London (1714)
Sir William Humphreys, 1st Baronet (died 1735)
Sir Orlando Humphreys, 2nd Baronet (died 1737)

References

Extinct baronetcies in the Baronetage of Great Britain
1714 establishments in Great Britain